Ningbo (139) is a Type 956EM destroyer of the People's Liberation Army Navy.

Development and design 

A project began in the late 1960s when it was becoming obvious to the Soviet Navy that naval guns still had an important role particularly in support of amphibious landings, but existing gun cruisers and destroyers were showing their age. A new design was started, employing a new  automatic gun turret.

The Chinese People's Liberation Army Navy Surface Force (PLAN) had two modified Sovremenny class destroyers delivered in December 1999 and November 2000. In 2002, the PLAN ordered two improved versions designated 956-EM. The first vessel was launched in late 2005, while the second was launched in 2006. All four vessels were commissioned to the East Sea Fleet. 

The project cost 600 million US$ (mid-1990s price) for Project 956E (two ships), and 1.4 billion US$ (early-2000s price) for Project 956EM (two ships).

Construction and career 
Ningbo was laid down on 15 November 2002 and launched on 23 July 2004 by Severnaya Verf in Saint Petersburg. She was commissioned on 27 September 2006.

On 15 March 2021, Taiyuan, Ningbo and a Type 054A of the East Sea Fleet conducted a live firing exercise.

References 

2004 ships
Ships built at Severnaya Verf
Sovremenny-class destroyers